Main Quad may refer to

 Main Quad (Stanford University)
 Main Quad on the campus of the University of Illinois at Urbana–Champaign
 Main Quad, also called the “God Quad”, on the Campus of the University of Notre Dame

See also
 Quadrangle (architecture)